The broadband barb (Enteromius macrotaenia) is a species of cyprinid fish in the genus Enteromius. It is found in Lake Malawi and the lower Zambezi, Pungwe River and Buzi River. The broadband barb is exploited for human consumption and for the aquarium trade.

References 

 

Enteromius
Cyprinid fish of Africa
Fish of Lake Malawi
Fish described in 1933
Taxa named by E. Barton Worthington